{|

{{Infobox ship career
| Hide header = 
| Ship country = Sweden
| Ship flag = 
| Ship name = *Tor Hollandia (1966–1975)
Ariadne (1975–1999)
Ouranos (1999–2007)F. Diamond (2007–2010)Diamond (2010)
| Ship owner = *Tor Line (1975–99)
Minoan Lines (1975–1999)
Fragmar Shipping Co (1999–2007)
F. Lines (2007–2010)
Cemsan Gemi Sokum (2010)
| Ship registry = *  Gothenburg, Sweden (1966–1975)
  Heraklion, Greece (1975–1999)
  Valletta, Malta (1999–2010)
| Ship ordered = 
| Ship builder = Lübecker Flender-Werke Lübeck, Germany
| Ship yard number = 559
| Ship original cost = 
| Ship laid down = June 1966
| Ship launched = 12 November 1966
| Ship commissioned = 
| Ship decommissioned = 
| Ship in service = 17 April 1967
| Ship out of service = January 2001
| Ship identification = *
| Ship renamed = 
| Ship fate = Scrapped at Aliağa, Turkey in 2010
| Ship notes = 
}}

|}

MS Tor Hollandia was built in 1966 and launched and christened by Godother Huck Van Rietscoten. She was introduced on the Tor Line service from Immingham to Amsterdam and Gothenburg. She was operated under three additional names (Ariadne, Ouranos, and F Diamond), before being sold for scrap in 2010.

Description
The ship was built as yard number 559 by Lübecker Flender-Werke Lübeck, West Germany.

As built, she could carry 980 passengers and had 472 cabins. She could carry 300 cars.

HistoryTor Hollandia was launched on 12 November 1966 by Huck van Rietschoten, her sponsor. She was delivered to Tor Line on 12 April 1967. Her port of registry was Gothenburg, Sweden and the IMO Number 6704402 was allocated. She entered service on 17 April 1967 providing passenger service between Immingham, United Kingdom, Amsterdam, Netherlands and Gothenburg, Sweden. In 1975 she was due to be sold to an Arab shipping company with which Tor Line would co-operate. She was to have been called Saudi Moon and operate between Jeddah and Suez. However, the negotiations dragged on over time and a Greek shipping company, Minoan Lines became interested and bought her in October 1975. She was renamed Ariadne. She was reflagged to Greece, with Heraklion as her port of registry. Under this new career she served for the next 24 years sailing on almost all of Minoan's routes. In 1991, she was rebuilt to provide more cabin space. She could carry 1,620 passengers in 556 cabins, and could carry 280 cars. In 1997, she was chartered by the General National Maritime Co., Tripoli, Libya for service between Tripoli and Valletta, Malta.

In 1999,  Ariadne was sold to Fragmar Shipping Co., Valletta, Malta. She was reflagged to Malta, and renamed Ouranos, entering service on the Corfu, Greece - Brindisi, Italy route. In January 2001, Ouranos was sold to F Lines Inc, Majuro, Marshall Islands. She was renamed F Diamond on 16 February 2001, but her registry remained with Malta.

A late nickname for the ship was "Black Diamond", after it was painted black.  The ship served as a party ship in Genoa after it was detained there for eight days on 9 October 2008, after inspection found 21 deficiencies; the party ship use caused local controversy. In June 2010, F Diamond was sold by auction to Cemsan Gemi Sokum, Aliağa, Turkey, which planned to use her as a floating hotel. She was sold in September 2010 to Turkish shipbreakers and was renamed Diamond''. She arrived at the shipbreakers on 11 September.

References

External links
 
 
 
 

1966 ships
Ships built in Germany
Ferries of Sweden
Ferries of Greece
Ferries of Malta